The M88 Recovery Vehicle is one of the largest armored recovery vehicles (ARV) in use by United States Armed Forces. There are three variants, the M88, the M88A1, and the M88A2 HERCULES (Heavy Equipment Recovery Combat Utility Lifting Extraction System). The M88 series has seen action in the Vietnam War, the Persian Gulf War, the Iraq War, and the War in Afghanistan, and to a lesser extent during the Kosovo War, where they were deployed to help recover heavy armored vehicles of the Allied ground units.

History

Design
The design of this vehicle was based on the chassis and parts of the automotive component of the M48 Patton and M60 tanks. The original M88 was introduced in 1961, M88A1 in 1977, and the current M88A2 introduced in 1997.

Development
It was originally manufactured by Bowen McLaughlin York, later the BMY division of Harsco Corporation, in 1961. The company later merged with FMC Corp. to form the United Defense Industries in 1994. United was acquired by BAE Systems in 2005 to become BAE Systems Land and Armaments. In February 2008 BAE was awarded a $185 million contract modification from the U.S. Army to manufacture 90 Army-configured M88A2s, four United States Marine Corps-configured M88A2s and authorized spares list parts.

Role
The M88's primary role is to repair or replace damaged parts in fighting vehicles while under fire, as well as extricate vehicles that have become bogged down or entangled. The main winch on the M88A2 is capable of a 70-ton, single line recovery, and a 140-ton 2:1 recovery when used with the 140 ton pulley. The A-frame boom of the A2 can lift 35 tons when used in conjunction with the spade down. The spade can be used for light earth moving, and can be used to anchor the vehicle when using the main winch.

The M88 employs an Auxiliary power unit (APU) to provide auxiliary electrical and hydraulic power when the main engine is not in operation. It can be used to slave-start other vehicles, provide power for the hydraulic impact wrench, as well as a means to refuel or de-fuel vehicles as required. The M88 series of vehicles can refuel M1 tanks from its own fuel tanks, but this is a last resort due to the possibility of clogging the AGT-1500s fuel filters. The fuel pump draws fuel from the bottom of the fuel cell, and with it, all of the sediment that has accumulated with time.

Variants
M88 – 1961
M88A1 – 1977
M88A2 Hercules – 1991
M88A3 Hercules – future

All variants have a 12.7 mm M2 Browning .50 caliber machine gun, 432 mm ground clearance, 2.6 m fording depth, 1.1 m wall climb and 2.6 m trench crossing capabilities. There has been no major deviation in battlefield role through the M88 series. The later models are merely able to lift heavier loads. The M88A1 was designed around the now obsolete M60 Patton tanks, so it was in light of the fact that two M88A1s were required to tow the new M1 Abrams tank that the decision was made to upgrade to the M88A2 in 1991.

The original M88 produced from 1960 to 1964 used the Continental AVSI-1790-6A diesel engine. It had 980 HP at 2800 rpm, as well as a 10 HP gasoline auxiliary power unit. The M88A1 was powered by the Continental AVDS-1790-2DR Diesel engine and had a 10 HP Diesel auxiliary power unit.

While the original M88 and M88A1 are designated as a "Medium Recovery Vehicle", the M88A2, original designation being M88A1E1, is designated as "Heavy Recovery Vehicle". They are all similar in many fundamental ways. The later version is distinctly heavier at 70 tons, compared to the original 56 tons, and uses a different engine, an AVDS 1790-8CR with 1050 hp, compared to a Continental AVDS-1790-2DR, with 750 hp.

The M88A2 is slightly larger than its predecessors, at 8.6 × 3.7 × 3.2 m compared to 8.3 × 3.4 × 3.2 m. It has a lower top speed (40 km/h) and a significantly lower road range at 322 km, compared to 450 km. There have been improvements in braking and steering. The M88A2 has upgraded armor protection including armored track skirts and applique armor panels, which both previous models lack. The later M88A1 and M88A2 models are equipped with Nuclear, Biological, Chemical (NBC) defenses and a smoke screen generator. The crew number decreased from 5, to 3–4, to 3 through the series.

The M88A3 configuration features an upgraded powertrain, suspension and tracks, increasing the vehicle’s speed, survivability and reliability. The M88A3 features a seventh road wheel to reduce ground pressure and new hydropneumatic suspension units that enable the track to be locked out for greater control when recovering vehicles.

In February 2017, it was announced that the army had contracted BAE Systems Land and Armaments a $28 million contract modification for the procurement of 11 M88A2 recovery vehicles.

Criticism

One of the main issues afflicting the M88A2 is a high rate of winch failures. The leading cause of these failures is operation of the winch without tension on the cable. This leads to "birdnesting" loose wrapping and bunching up of the cable.

There is also concern with loss of tractive force when an M88A2 tows a heavy M1 Abrams on a slope in wet, muddy conditions. The M88A2 was extensively tested at the Aberdeen Proving Ground, Maryland, and in August 1998, was officially approved for the towing of 70-ton combat vehicles such as the M1 Abrams.

Operators

Current operators
: 13× M88A2 in service with the Australian Army. Another 6 ordered.
: 10× M88A1 still in service with the Austrian Armed Forces.
: 4× M88A1 in service with the Royal Bahraini Army.
: 17x M88A1 in service with the Brazilian Army
: 221× M88A1 + 87× M88A2 in service with the Egyptian Army.
: 95× M88A1 in service with the Greek Army.
: 29× M88A2 in service with the Iraqi Army. Another 8 ordered; to be delivered from late 2013-mid-2014.
: 25× M88A1 in service with the Israeli Army.
: 52× M88A1 in service with the Royal Jordanian Land Force.
: 35x M88A1 + 2x M88A2 in service with the Lebanese Armed Forces.<ref
name="SIPRI"/>
: 14× M88A2 in service with the Kuwait Army.
: 81× M88A1 in service with the Royal Moroccan Army
: 52× M88A1 in service with the Pakistan Army.
: 8× M88A1 in service with the Portuguese Army.
: 78× M88A1 in service with the Saudi Arabian Army. The potential sale of a further 20 was announced in August 2016.
: 1× M88A1 in service with the Spanish Navy Marines.
: 2× M88A1 in service with the Sudan People's Armed Forces.
: 37× M88A1 in service with the Republic of China Army. 14× M88A2 order.
: 22× M88A1 + 6 M88A2 in service with the Royal Thai Army.
: 6× M88A1 in service with the Tunisian Armed Forces.
: 33× M88A1 in service with the Turkish Armed Forces

United States Army: total 629 of all variants procured.
United States Marine Corps: total 69 procured.

Former operators 
: 125× M88A1 (local designation: Bergepanzer 1) in service from 1962 to 2000 with the German Army, replaced by Bergepanzer 2 (based on Leopard 1) and Bergepanzer 3 Büffel (based on Leopard 2)
 Lebanese Forces (militia)

Future operator 
: 26×M88A2 on order
: 8x will be sent as part of military aid package

See also
Challenger Armoured Repair and Recovery Vehicle (CRARRV)
XM1205 Field Recovery and Maintenance Vehicle, U.S. Army proposed replacement under Future Combat Systems

Notes

References
Military Vehicles from World War I to the Present – Hans Halberstadt, 1998
Patton, A History of the American Medium Battle Tank, Vol. 1 – R.P. Hunnicutt, Presidio Press, 1984

External links

M88A2 Factsheet on BAE Systems website
M88 data on Global Security website
M88 Recovery Vehicle
M88 Recovery Vehicle 2023

Armoured recovery vehicles of the United States
Tracked armoured recovery vehicles
Armoured fighting vehicles of Australia
United States Marine Corps equipment
Military vehicles introduced in the 1960s